Kodak fortress was a fort built in 1635 by the order of the Polish king Władysław IV Vasa and the Sejm on the Dnieper River near what would become the town of Stari Kodaky (now near the city of Dnipro in Ukraine). In 1711, according to the Treaty of the Pruth the fortress was destroyed by the Russians.

One of the Dnieper Rapids was called after the fortress.

History
It was constructed by Stanisław Koniecpolski to control Cossacks of the Zaporizhian Sich, to prevent Ukrainian peasants from joining forces with the Cossacks and to guard the southeastern corner of the Polish–Lithuanian Commonwealth. The Poles tried to establish order in that area, and commissioned French military cartographer and engineer William le Vasseur de Beauplan to construct the fort. The building cost around 100,000 Polish zlotys. The annual maintenance of eight thousand registered Cossacks also cost about 100,000 Polish zlotys. The dragoon garrison was commanded by the French officer Jean de Marion.

Shortly after construction was completed in July 1635, in the Sulima Uprising, the Cossack forces of Ivan Sulima captured the fortress in a surprise attack on the night of 11/12 August 1635. The Cossacks killed the entire German mercenary garrison (numbering 200 men, 15 Germans on duty outside the fortress survived) and demolished the fortress. Legend has it that Jean Marion was covered with gunpowder, put on a pole and set on fire, and that the subsequent explosion threw him into the Dnieper.

The Poles hired the German engineer Friedrich Getkant and rebuilt Kodak, three times larger, in 1639. The fortress contained a Catholic church with a monastery and an Orthodox church. Its garrison increased to 600, with artillery support. About two miles outside of the fortress was erected a huge guard tower. Jan Zoltowski became governor of the fortress, while Adam Koniecpolski (a nephew of Stanisław) became commandant.

During the Khmelnytsky Uprising of 1648, Krzysztof Lada-Grodzicki commanded the fortress. It surrendered to the Cossacks on 1 October 1648, after a 7-month siege, upon hearing the news of Polish defeat at the Battle of Pyliavtsi on 24 September 1648. Rank and file defenders were massacred or drowned in the river after they had left Kodak upon capitulation. The Cossacks sold the Kodak commander and some other officers to the Tatars as slaves.

After the Treaty of Pereyaslav in 1654, Kodak fortress was manned by the Cossacks. Peter I of Russia razed it in accordance with the terms of the Treaty of the Pruth with the Ottoman Empire in 1711.

The Soviet government attempted to destroy the remnants of fortress in order to eradicate traces of Polish influence on Ukraine by establishing a quarry on the site in the early 1930s. The quarry closed in 1994, but by then two thirds of fortress was completely destroyed. One wall remained from the fortifications.

 the site consists only of ruins, but has become a popular tourist attraction.

Gallery

References

Bibliography
  Czołowski A., Kudak. Przyczynki do założenia i upadku twierdzy. (Notes to the establishment and destruction of the fortress) "Kwartalnik Historyczny" (Historical Quarterly) R. 40:1926, pp 161–184

External links
 http://www.fortified-places.com/kudak/
 Historical overview 

Buildings and structures completed in 1635
Castles in Ukraine
Forts in Ukraine
Buildings and structures demolished in 1711
Tourist attractions in Dnipropetrovsk Oblast
1635 establishments in the Polish–Lithuanian Commonwealth
Historic sites in Ukraine
Demolished buildings and structures in Ukraine